Spider-Man: Edge of Time is a 2011 video game based on the superhero Spider-Man, developed by Beenox and released for the Nintendo DS, Nintendo 3DS, PlayStation 3, Xbox 360, and Wii. The game was directed by Gerard Lehiany and Ramiro Belanger. The story, written by Peter David, Ramiro Belanger, and Gérard Lehiany, revolves around both Peter Parker, the original Spider-Man, and Miguel O'Hara, Spider-Man 2099, as they combat a new threat across space and time and attempt to save both of their realities, while also trying to prevent Parker's death from coming to fruition. The game is a sequel to 2010's Spider-Man: Shattered Dimensions, although Spider-Man Noir and Ultimate Spider-Man are not featured, only mentioned.

Gameplay contains a "cause-and-effect" system in which one Spider-Man's actions will affect the other and vice versa. It was released on October 4, 2011 in North America, on October 14, 2011 in Europe, and on October 26, 2011 in Australia. Edge of Time is the second Spider-Man title to be developed by Beenox, after Shattered Dimensions, and the first one released since Activision and Marvel's decision to make Beenox their lead developer on future Spider-Man games. Spider-Man: Edge of Time, along with most other games published by Activision that had used the Marvel license, was de-listed and removed from all digital storefronts on January 1, 2014.

Gameplay
Spider-Man: Edge of Time is a linear third-person action-adventure video game where the player assumes the two versions of Spider-Man, spanning across the traditional Marvel Comics universe and the futuristic 2099 universe; the game automatically switches between the two Spider-Men. Gameplay is similar to that of its predecessor Shattered Dimensions: players can web swing, web zip, crawl walls, and use the 'spider-sense' to identify enemies or objects of interest. The Spider-Man 2099 free falling sections from Shattered Dimensions also return, as does the upgrade system; XP is earned from completing various challenges with each Spider-Man, and can be used to purchase new fighting moves, increase stats, or unlock alternate costumes. Both Spider-Men have a new exclusive ability: the original Spider-Man (Peter Parker) has a "hyper-sense" mode, allowing him to move quickly, pulverize enemies one at a time or run through elaborate laser defence systems without getting hurt; Spider-Man 2099 (Miguel O'Hara), meanwhile, can create a fake simulation of himself to divert an enemy, to either attack without them noticing or to move to another area unharmed while their attack destroys something in front of him, such as a highly secure lock.

Plot
In the year 2099, Miguel O'Hara / Spider-Man 2099 (Christopher Daniel Barnes) investigates Alchemax scientist Walker Sloan (Val Kilmer). While spying on him, the former discovers the latter plans to travel back in time to establish Alchemax years before its original founding, allowing him to rebuild the company in his image and dismantle its corporate rivals before they are even established.

O'Hara fails to stop Sloan from entering his time gateway and is temporarily trapped between dimensions and witnesses visions of his predecessor Peter Parker / Spider-Man (Josh Keaton) being killed by an unknown assailant. Returning to an altered version of 2099, an unaffected O'Hara uses Parker's DNA from Alchemax's archives to establish a mental, chronal link between them across time to warn Parker, now working for Alchemax, of his impending death. However, Parker refuses to heed it and travels to the 66th floor to stop a rampaging Anti-Venom (Steve Blum), forcing O'Hara to head to his own 66th floor.

Along the way, the Spider-Men discover Sloan has built another gateway in Parker's time, which created a "quantum causality field", linking their time periods and causing actions in the past to directly alter the future. Arriving at the 66th floor, Parker finds himself confronted by Anti-Venom, Sloan, and Alchemax's head scientist Dr. Otto Octavius (Dave B. Mitchell). He battles Anti-Venom, who drains his powers to the point of death. Before Anti-Venom can kill him, O'Hara pulls Parker through the gateway and places him in a containment unit to heal while he travels to the past and defeats Anti-Venom, breaking the chips that allowed Sloan to control him. Furious at Sloan for using him, Anti-Venom attacks Sloan and Octavius, inadvertently pushing all three into the gateway; destabilizing it and trapping the Spider-Men in each other's time periods.

While attempting to repair the gateway, the Spider-Men are attacked by inter-dimensional tentacles where O'Hara saves Mary Jane Watson (Laura Vandervoort) from a near-death situation and Parker fights 2099 clones of Black Cat (Katee Sackhoff). Using Alchemax's archives, they succeed, though Parker encounters his future self (Josh Keaton) who used an anti-aging drug to become Alchemax's CEO and wishes to use Sloan's portal for his own ends. Eventually, the Spider-Men are able to return to their original time periods, but a monster resembling Anti-Venom with Octavius' tentacles follows Parker through as the gateway creates a "time storm". Calling it "Atrocity" (Fred Tatasciore), Parker evades the monster while attempting to secure DNA samples from it for O'Hara, who discovers it is a combination of Sloan, Anti-Venom, and Octavius and theorizes that forcing it back into the gateway should disrupt the time storm.

However, the CEO contacts O'Hara to reveal his intent to harness the storm's quantum energy so he can rewrite history in his image. While Parker lures Atrocity back to the gateway and sends it through, O'Hara does the same with the CEO. This collapses the gateway, ending the time storm, and reversing all of Sloan's changes with only the Spider-Men remembering the events.

During the credits, O'Hara gives Parker a lecture on time-travel.

Development and marketing

Information on the game was first released at WonderCon on April 2, 2011.

Customers who pre-ordered the game at GameStop got early access to bonus downloadable alternate costumes inspired from the Identity Crisis storyline, while pre-orders from Amazon.com allowed the customer to unlock Spider-Man's Future Foundation costume for the PlayStation 3 and Xbox 360 versions early in the game. Customers who pre-ordered the game at Best Buy got early access to Spider-Man's Big Time costume. The Spider-Man costume worn by Miles Morales, Peter Parker's successor in the Ultimate Marvel universe, was also available. The Spider-Armor, Cosmic Spider-Man, Cosmic Spider-Man 2099, Iron Spider, Secret War, 1602 Spider-Man, Scarlet Spider and Negative Zone costumes can be unlocked, only if a player has a save game of Shattered Dimensions on their PlayStation 3, Xbox 360, or Wii.

Music
The original score music was written by Gerard Marino, lead composer of the God of War series. The PlayStation 3 is the only version to feature DTS surround sound.

Reception

Spider-Man: Edge of Time received mixed reviews. McKinley Noble of GamePro highly criticized the game pointing out it ultimately doesn't live up to Shattered Dimensions, only giving Edge of Time a "fair" rating of 3 out of 5. Joystiq was more critical, giving the game 2.5/5 and criticizing Beenox's misuse of the Spider-Man character. IGN gave the PS3 and Xbox 360 versions a 4.5 out of 10, but gave the Wii version a 6.0 and the Nintendo 3DS version a 5.5. GameSpot gave the game a 6 out of 10, saying that it "tells an enjoyably absurd time-hopping tale, but stepping into the tights of its two heroes doesn't feel as empowering as it should". Game Informer gave it a 6.5, saying "Edge of Time is a major step back from the formula that worked." Destructoid gave the game a 5 out of 10. GameTrailers gave the game a 5.4 out of 10, praising the story and voice acting, but criticizing the repetition of the gameplay.

References

External links
 
 

2011 video games
3D platform games
Action-adventure games
Activision games
Beenox games
Cyberpunk video games
Dystopian video games
Nintendo 3DS games
Nintendo DS games
Other Ocean Interactive games
PlayStation 3 games
Single-player video games
Superhero crossover video games
Video game sequels
Video games about cloning
Video games about parallel universes
Video games about time travel
Video games based on Spider-Man
Video games developed in Canada
Video games scored by Gerard Marino
Video games set in New York City
Video games set in the 2090s
Wii games
Xbox 360 games